Cold World may refer to:
 Cold World (EP), a 1991 EP by Godflesh
 "Cold World" (song), a 1989 song by Steve "Silk" Hurley and Jamie Principle
 Cold World (Naomi Shelton & the Gospel Queens album), 2014
 Cold World (Of Mice & Men album), 2016
 "Cold World", a 2021 song by G Herbo from the album 25